Charles Francis Buddy (October 4, 1887 – March 6, 1966) was an American prelate of the Roman Catholic Church. He served as the first bishop of the new Diocese of San Diego in California from 1936 until his death in 1966. 

Buddy built what is today the University of San Diego, including a women's college, women, a men's college, a law school, a theological seminary, a basilica for the chapel, and offices for the diocese.

Biography

Early life 
Charles Buddy was born on October 4, 1887, in St. Joseph, Missouri, one of seven children of Charles Allen and Annie (née Farrell) Buddy. His father was a wholesale fruit merchant. He received his early education at the "Little Convent", a parochial school for boys in his native city. At age 10, he enrolled at the Christian Brothers College, also in St. Joseph. He entered St. Benedict's College in Atchison, Kansas, in 1902, and transferred to St. Mary's College in St. Marys, Kansas, two years later.

Following his graduation from St. Mary's in 1909, Buddy began his studies for the priesthood at the Pontifical North American College in Rome. He earned a doctorate in philosophy in 1911 and a licentiate in theology in 1913.

Priesthood 
Buddy was ordained a priest by Cardinal Alessio Ascalesi for the Diocese of Saint Joseph at the Basilica of St. John Lateran in Rome on September 19, 1914. He returned to Missouri in August 1915 and was assigned as a curate at St. Joseph's Cathedral in St. Joseph. In 1917, Buddy was named chancellor of the diocese and secretary to Bishop Maurice Burke. Buddy resigned from both positions in 1919 after a severe case of influenza.

After regaining his health, Buddy served as diocesan director of the Society for the Propagation of the Faith from 1922 to 1936. He also served as rector of St. Joseph's Cathedral from 1926 to 1936. In 1930, Buddy founded St. Vincent's Cafeteria and Shelter for the homeless, which the government took over in 1934 as a transient relief bureau. He also established St. Augustine's Parish, the first Catholic parish for African-Americans in northern Missouri. He sat on the municipal board of health, assisted in Community Chest campaigns, and founded an information forum for people of all religions.

Bishop of San Diego 
On October 31, 1936, Buddy was appointed the first bishop of the newly erected Diocese of San Diego by Pope Pius XI. He received his episcopal consecration on December 21, 1936, from Bishop Charles Le Blond, with Bishops Gerald Bergan and Francis Monaghan serving as co-consecrators. His installation took place at St. Joseph's Cathedral in San Diego on February 3, 1937. 

The new diocese was located in Southern California and included San Bernardino, Riverside, Imperial, and San Diego Counties. Buddy was close friends with Bishop William O'Brien, director of the Catholic Church Extension Society, which donated to the Diocese of San Diego for the construction of churches and the financial support of priests.

In 1939, Buddy declared that "the world is in a stupor from an overdose of materialism." A strong opponent of communism, which he claimed wants to "destroy both church and state", Buddy once said, "These 'isms' have tried the patience of our poor and underprivileged who are being tempted by false prophets and insincere leaders." He co-founded the University of San Diego in 1949, serving as its first president from 1950 to 1966. He attended the first session of the Second Vatican Council in Rome in 1962.

Buddy died on March 6, 1966, at age 78 in Banning, California, on a confirmation trip to parishes in the San Gorgonio Pass .

References

Further reading
Burt J. Boudoin. Fortress on the Hill: Founding the University of San Diego and the San Diego College for Women, 1942-1963 (2001)

External links

History of University of San Diego

Former Bishops of San Diego

1887 births
1966 deaths
Participants in the Second Vatican Council
People from St. Joseph, Missouri
20th-century Roman Catholic bishops in the United States
Roman Catholic bishops of San Diego
Catholics from Missouri